Scott Andrew Seely (born 1981) is an American Anglican bishop. Consecrated in 2020 in the Church of Nigeria North American Mission (CONNAM), he currently serves as bishop suffragan of the Anglican Diocese of All Nations (formerly the Anglican Diocese of the West) in the Anglican Church in North America.

Biography
Seely is a native Texan. He received his B.A. in church music from Texas Lutheran University in 2003, his M.A. in theology from the Master's Seminary in 2007, his M.Div. from Trinity School for Ministry in 2010, and his D.Min. in congregational development from Nashotah House in 2019.

Prior to his ordination, Seely was youth minister at the Episcopal Church of Reconciliation in San Antonio and as worship leader at Christ Church in the Hill Country in Bulverde, Texas. He was ordained in CONNAM's predecessor entity, the Convocation of Anglicans in North America. Since 2010, Seely has been rector of Three Streams Anglican Church in San Antonio. He was appointed canon for church planting and local mission in the Diocese of CANA West in 2013 and made an archdeacon in 2016. In 2020, Seely was elected a suffragan bishop for the diocese by the Church of Nigeria's house of bishops, and consecrated by Nicholas Okoh at Holy Trinity Cathedral in Lokoja, Nigeria, on March 20, 2020.

In October 2022, new CONNAM bylaws were released, signaling the permanent establishment of CONNAM as an alternative Anglican jurisdiction in the United States and Canada. In response, the Anglican Diocese of the West voted to depart from the Church of Nigeria. The ACNA received Seely and Felix Orji into its college of bishops, and the Diocese of the West voted to affiliate with ACNA, although some congregations elected to remain in CONNAM.

Seely is married to Miriam and has three children. As a musician, he plays piano, guitar, ukelele and hammered dulcimer.

References

External links
Profile on ADOTW website

1981 births
Living people
21st-century Anglican bishops in the United States
Bishops of the Anglican Church in North America
21st-century Anglican bishops in Nigeria